Radhe Chandra Yadav is a member of 2nd Nepalese Constituent Assembly. He won Bara–2 seat in CA assembly, 2013 from Nepali Congress.

References

Year of birth missing (living people)
Living people
Nepali Congress politicians from Madhesh Province
Nepal MPs 1994–1999
Members of the 2nd Nepalese Constituent Assembly